The Mikani-class (ミカニ) locomotives were a group of steam tender locomotives of the Chosen Government Railway (Sentetsu) with 2-8-2 wheel arrangement. The "Mika" name came from the American naming system for steam locomotives, under which locomotives with 2-8-2 wheel arrangement were called "Mikado" in honour of the Emperor of Japan, as the first 2-8-2 locomotives in the world were built for Japan.

Of all Mika classes, 131 went to the Korean National Railroad in South Korea and 292 to the Korean State Railway in North Korea. Of these 423 locomotives, 356 were from Sentetsu; the other 67 were South Manchuria Railway Mikai-class engines on loan to Sentetsu along with Mika-type locomotives which had previously belonged to the twelve privately owned railways in Korea before 1945. Not included in this number, however, are the six SMR Mikai-class locomotives that were assigned to SMR's Rajin depot for operation on SMR's lines in northeastern Korea, and the eight SMR Mikaro-class locomotives likewise assigned to the Rajin depot; these fourteen locomotives were taken over by the Korean State Railway. Despite the DPRK government's extensive anti-Japanese propaganda, the railway nevertheless continues to use the "Mika" name officially for these locomotives even though it refers to the Japanese emperor.

Description
By the late 1910s, existing multipurpose locomotives were proving insufficient for the increasingly heavy freight trains being run in Korea. To fill the need for dedicated freight locomotives, in 1919 Sentetsu imported twelve Mikai-class and twelve Mikani-class locomotives from the United States in 1919.

The second of the original two groups of 2-8-2 locomotives to be delivered to Sentetsu in 1919 was the Mikani class built by ALCo in 1919. Originally numbered ミカニ801–ミカニ812, they became ミカニ1–ミカニ12 in Sentetsu's 1938 general renumbering.

Postwar
After the partition of Korea, both the Korean State Railway in the North and the Korean National Railroad in the South operated Mikani class locomotives, but the exact disposition between the two is uncertain. However, it is known that ミカニ4 went to the Korean State Railway after the 1947 division of Sentetsu assets. It was destroyed during the Korean War, then captured by the US Army and taken south to strip for parts. In the South they were designated 미카2 (Mika2) class, in the North they were initially designated 미가두 (Migadu) class, and later renumbered in the 6200 series.

Construction

References

Locomotives of Korea
Locomotives of South Korea
Locomotives of North Korea
Railway locomotives introduced in 1919
2-8-2 locomotives
ALCO locomotives